USS Sylvania has been the name of two ships in the service of the United States Navy.

United States Navy ship names